Carl Mumba (born 6 May 1995) is a Zimbabwean cricketer who plays for Mid West Rhinos. He made his Test cricket debut for the Zimbabwe cricket team in October 2016.

Domestic career
In December 2018, during the opening round of the 2018–19 Logan Cup, Mumba took six wickets for seven runs in the second innings against Mountaineers. These were the best figures for a bowler taking six wickets in a first-class cricket match in Zimbabwe.

He made his Twenty20 debut for Mid West Rhinos in the 2018–19 Stanbic Bank 20 Series on 13 March 2019. In December 2020, he was selected to play for the Rhinos in the 2020–21 Logan Cup.

International career
In October 2016, he was included in Zimbabwe's Test squad for their series against Sri Lanka. He made his Test debut for Zimbabwe against Sri Lanka on 29 October 2016 and became the 100th player to represent Zimbabwe in Tests. The following month he was included in Zimbabwe's One Day International (ODI) squad for the tri-series against Sri Lanka and the West Indies. He made his ODI debut in the first match of the tri-series, against Sri Lanka.

In February 2017, he was named in an academy squad by Zimbabwe Cricket to tour England later that year. In February 2020, he was named in Zimbabwe's Twenty20 International (T20I) squad for their series against Bangladesh. He made his T20I debut for Zimbabwe, against Bangladesh, on 9 March 2020.

References

External links
 

1995 births
Living people
Zimbabwean cricketers
Zimbabwe Test cricketers
Zimbabwe One Day International cricketers
Zimbabwe Twenty20 International cricketers
Mid West Rhinos cricketers
Sportspeople from Kwekwe